This is a list of actors that have appeared physically (but not always characteristically) in the Eon Productions series of the James Bond film series more than once.

MI6 Branch: Universal Exports – United Kingdom

M – Head of MI-6

Bernard Lee
In the Bond films, Bernard Lee's character, M, is Admiral Sir Miles Messervy (only ever named, besides as 'M', as 'Admiral' and 'Miles' on screen in his appearances), Bond's irascible boss who sends him out on assignments. He also portrays M along with Lois Maxwell as Moneypenny in the 1975 French comedy " Bons baisers de Hong Kong". Lee was succeeded by Robert Brown, though not necessarily playing the same character (Brown had played another admiral in the series previously).

Dame Judi Dench, a friend of Lee, would later take over the role of a brand-new M, starting in 1995 with some references to her predecessor, including an oil painting of Lee in the role seen in MI6's secondary HQ (a Scottish castle).

Lee starred in eleven James Bond films.
 Dr. No (1962)
 From Russia with Love (1963)
 Goldfinger (1964)
 Thunderball (1965)
 You Only Live Twice (1967)
 On Her Majesty's Secret Service (1969)
 Diamonds Are Forever (1971)
 Live and Let Die (1973)
 The Man with the Golden Gun (1974)
 The Spy Who Loved Me (1977)
 Moonraker (1979)

Robert Brown
After Lee's death in 1981, the producers hired actor Robert Brown to continue the role in the Bond films. Brown picks up the role in Octopussy, however it is never explicitly stated on screen whether Robert Brown's character is intended to be the same person played by Lee, if he was intended to be Admiral Hargreaves, the role played by Brown in 1977's The Spy Who Loved Me, or if he is supposed to be another character altogether.

Brown played M in the following James Bond films:

 Octopussy (1983)
 A View to a Kill (1985)
 The Living Daylights (1987)
 Licence to Kill (1989)

Judi Dench
In 1995, actress Dame Judi Dench became known to an international audience after taking over the role of M starting with GoldenEye and continuing through all of the Pierce Brosnan films. She is the only actor from Brosnan's era to remain in the rebooted franchise featuring Daniel Craig, starring in 2006's Casino Royale, 2008's Quantum of Solace, and 2012's Skyfall, followed by a cameo in 2015's Spectre. A painting of Dench's M is shown at the relocated M16 headquarters in 2021's No Time to Die. Dench played M in a total of eight films.

 GoldenEye (1995)
 Tomorrow Never Dies (1997)
 The World Is Not Enough (1999)
 Die Another Day (2002)
 Casino Royale (2006)
 Quantum of Solace (2008)
 Skyfall (2012)
 Spectre (2015)

Ralph Fiennes
In 2012, following the death of Judi Dench's M in Skyfall, the character of Gareth Mallory (Ralph Fiennes) takes over from her in the role as M.

Fiennes played M in the following films:

 Skyfall (2012)
 Spectre (2015)
 No Time to Die (2020)

Q – Quartermaster

Desmond Llewelyn
Starting with the second film in the James Bond series, From Russia with Love (1963), Desmond Llewelyn appeared as Q (the quartermaster of the MI6 gadget lab known as Q-branch) in every Bond film, except Live and Let Die (1973), until The World Is Not Enough (1999). He had originally been chosen for the role as he had previously worked with the director Terence Young on the 1950 war film They Were Not Divided. In the 2002 film Die Another Day, John Cleese, who played the character R, the assistant to Q in The World Is Not Enough, was promoted to the head of Q-branch, thus taking on the title of Q. In all, Llewelyn appeared in 17 Bond films, more than any other actor, and worked with the first five James Bond actors. He also portrayed Q in a 1967 made-for-television special (produced by Eon Productions) entitled, Welcome to Japan, Mr. Bond which was included in the 2006 special edition DVD release of You Only Live Twice.

Desmond Llewelyn appears as Major Boothroyd/Q in the following films:
 From Russia with Love (1963)
 Goldfinger (1964)
 Thunderball (1965)
 You Only Live Twice (1967)
 On Her Majesty's Secret Service (1969)
 Diamonds are Forever (1971)
 The Man with the Golden Gun (1974)
 The Spy Who Loved Me (1977)
 Moonraker (1979)
 For Your Eyes Only (1981)
 Octopussy (1983)
 A View to a Kill (1985)
 The Living Daylights (1987)
 Licence to Kill (1989)
 Goldeneye (1995)
 Tomorrow Never Dies (1997)
 The World Is Not Enough (1999)

John Cleese
In 1999, comedian John Cleese appeared in the James Bond movie, The World Is Not Enough as Q's assistant, referred to by Bond as R. In 2002, when Cleese reprised his role in Die Another Day, the character was promoted, making Cleese the new quartermaster (Q) of MI6. In 2004, Cleese was featured as Q in the video game James Bond 007: Everything or Nothing, featuring his likeness and voice.

Cleese appears as R/Q in the following films:
 The World Is Not Enough (1999)
 Die Another Day (2002)

Ben Whishaw
Actor Ben Whishaw took over the role in 2012's Skyfall. Q was absent from the two previous movies, Casino Royale and Quantum of Solace and it was Daniel Craig who had expressed concern over the character's absence, and expressed his hope that Q would return in Skyfall.

Whishaw appears as Q in the following films:
 Skyfall (2012)
 Spectre (2015)
 No Time to Die (2021)

Moneypenny – Secretary

Lois Maxwell
Lois Maxwell lobbied for the role in James Bond, as her husband had had a heart attack and they needed the money. Director Terence Young, who once had turned her down on the grounds that she looked like she "smelled of soap", offered her either Moneypenny or the recurring Bond girlfriend, Sylvia Trench, but she was uncomfortable with a revealing scene the latter had in the screenplay. The role as M's secretary guaranteed just two days' work at £100 per day; Maxwell supplied her own clothes. The Trench character, however, was eliminated after From Russia with Love.

In 1967, Maxwell angered Sean Connery for a time by appearing in the Italian spy spoof Operation Kid Brother with the star's brother Neil Connery and Bernard Lee. In 1971, Maxwell was nearly replaced for Diamonds Are Forever after demanding a pay raise; her policewoman's cap disguises hair she had already dyed for another role. In 1975, she plays Moneypenny weeping for the death of James Bond in a short scene with Bernard Lee as M in the French comedy Bons Baisers de Hong Kong. For the filming of A View to a Kill, her final appearance, Bond producer Albert "Cubby" Broccoli told her that the two of them were the only ones from Dr. No still working on the series. Maxwell asked that her character be killed off, but Broccoli recast the role instead.

As Moneypenny, according to author Tom Lisanti, she was seen as an "anchor", with her flirtatious repartee with Bond lending the films realism and humanism. For Moneypenny, Bond was "unobtainable", freeing the characters to make outrageous sexual double entendres. At the same time, her character did little to imbue the series with changing feminist notions.

Her total screen time as Moneypenny in 14 films was less than two hours, and she spoke fewer than 200 words.

 As Miss Moneypenny 
 Dr. No (1962)
 From Russia with Love (1963)
 Goldfinger (1964)
 Thunderball (1965)
 You Only Live Twice (1967)
 On Her Majesty's Secret Service (1969)
 Diamonds are Forever (1971)
 Live and Let Die (1973)
 The Man with the Golden Gun (1974)
 The Spy Who Loved Me (1977)
 Moonraker (1979)
 For Your Eyes Only (1981)
 Octopussy (1983)
 A View to a Kill (1985)

Caroline Bliss
Caroline Bliss was only featured in two James Bond movies (the only two Timothy Dalton starred in as James Bond). Although, her role in Licence to Kill was little more than a cameo. She is the only actress to play Moneypenny while wearing glasses. She is also the youngest actress to play Moneypenny.
 The Living Daylights (1987)
 Licence to Kill (1989)

Samantha Bond
Samantha Bond starred in four James Bond films as Miss Moneypenny.  She retired from her role with the departure of Pierce Brosnan as James Bond.

She appeared as Miss Moneypenny in:

 GoldenEye (1995)
 Tomorrow Never Dies (1997)
 The World Is Not Enough (1999)
 Die Another Day (2002)

In a commercial for London's 2012 Olympic bid, Bond once again suited up as Miss Moneypenny. She appeared alongside Roger Moore, who played 007 between 1973 and 1985.

Naomie Harris

The role of Miss Moneypenny was not cast in the following Bond films, Casino Royale and Quantum of Solace. The character eventually returned in the 2012 film, Skyfall, under the alias 'Eve', played by Naomie Harris. It is only at the end of Skyfall that agent 'Eve' is revealed to be Moneypenny.

Harris played Moneypenny in the following films:

 Skyfall (2012)
 Spectre (2015)
 No Time to Die (2021)

Sir Frederick Gray, the Minister of Defence

Geoffrey Keen

He played the role of Frederick Gray, the Minister of Defence in six James Bond films between 1977 and 1987:

 The Spy Who Loved Me (1977) (in this film Bond calls him "Freddie" – in private, after the briefing at the naval base – when Gray tells him that he is to go to Egypt.)
 Moonraker (1979)
 For Your Eyes Only (1981)
 Octopussy (1983)
 A View to a Kill (1985)
 The Living Daylights (1987)

Bill Tanner – Chief of Staff

Michael Kitchen
Michael Kitchen appeared in two Bond films Goldeneye and The World Is Not Enough.

 GoldenEye (1995)
 The World Is Not Enough (1999)

Rory Kinnear
Rory Kinnear appeared as Bill Tanner in the four latest Bond films: Quantum of Solace, Skyfall and Spectre.

 Quantum of Solace (2008)
 Skyfall (2012)
 Spectre (2015)
 No Time to Die (2021)

Charles Robinson – Chief of Staff

Colin Salmon
Colin Salmon appeared in three Bond films as Chief of Staff Charles Robinson: Tomorrow Never Dies, The World Is Not Enough and Die Another Day.

 Tomorrow Never Dies (1997)
 The World Is Not Enough (1999)
 Die Another Day (2002)

Central Intelligence Agency/US Armed Forces – United States

Agent Felix Leiter

David Hedison
David Hedison is also notable as the first actor to have played James Bond's ally Felix Leiter in more than one film (Live and Let Die and Licence to Kill) (The second was Jeffrey Wright, who appeared as Leiter in Casino Royale (2006), and reprised the role in Quantum of Solace).

As Felix Leiter:
 Live and Let Die (1973)
 Licence to Kill (1989)

Jeffrey Wright
In 2006, Jeffrey Wright featured as Felix Leiter in the 21st James Bond movie, Casino Royale. This makes him the first African-American man to play the character in an Eon-produced Bond film (Bernie Casey played Leiter in the non-Eon Never Say Never Again). He also reprised the role in Quantum of Solace, making him only the second actor to appear as Leiter twice since David Hedison played the character in Live and Let Die and Licence to Kill.

As Felix Leiter:
 Casino Royale (2006)
 Quantum of Solace (2008)
 No Time to Die (2021)

General Brad Whitaker/Agent Jack Wade

Joe Don Baker
In 1987, Joe Don Baker got the role of the villain Brad Whitaker in the Bond film The Living Daylights, starring Timothy Dalton as James Bond. In 1995 and 1997 Baker returned to the series, this time playing a different character, CIA agent Jack Wade, in GoldenEye and Tomorrow Never Dies with Pierce Brosnan as Bond.

The character of Wade is similar to that of CIA agent Darius Jedburgh, played by Baker in the 1985 BBC Television serial Edge of Darkness. He was nominated for "Best Actor" by the British Academy Television Awards. This serial was directed by Martin Campbell, who also cast Baker as Wade in GoldenEye.

Baker was said to have actually tried out for the role of James Bond once for Live and Let Die.

Baker also shares a birthday with fellow Bond girl Maud Adams.

As General Brad Whitaker:
 The Living Daylights (1987)

As CIA Agent Jack Wade:
 GoldenEye (1995)
 Tomorrow Never Dies (1997)

Other actors

Michael G. Wilson
In 1972 Michael G. Wilson joined Eon Productions, the production company responsible for the James Bond film series dating back to 1962 that began with his stepfather Albert R. 'Cubby' Broccoli and Harry Saltzman. Wilson specifically worked in Eon Productions's legal department until taking a more active role as an assistant to Cubby Broccoli for the film The Spy Who Loved Me (1977). In 1979 Wilson became executive producer of the film Moonraker and since has been an executive producer or producer in every James Bond film, currently co-producing with his half-sister Barbara.
 Cameo Roles 
 Goldfinger (1964) – soldier at Fort Knox (uncredited)
 The Spy Who Loved Me (1977) – audience member at pyramid show (uncredited)
 Moonraker (1979) – tourist in Venice; NASA technician (uncredited)
 For Your Eyes Only (1981) – priest at Greek wedding (uncredited)
 Octopussy (1983) – member of Soviet Security Council; tourist on river boat in India (uncredited)
 A View to a Kill (1985) – voice heard when Bond enters San Francisco city hall (uncredited)
 The Living Daylights (1987) – audience member at Vienna Opera House (uncredited)
 Licence to Kill (1989) – voice of DEA agent in pre-title sequence "If they hurry, they might just be able to grab the bastard" (uncredited)
 GoldenEye (1995) – member of Russian Security Council (uncredited)
 Tomorrow Never Dies (1997) – Tom Wallace, Carver employee, appearing in video conference scene "Consider him slimed" (uncredited)
 The World Is Not Enough (1999) – employee in Baku casino scene (uncredited)
 Die Another Day (2002) – General Chandler (credited); tourist leaning against car in Havana (uncredited)
 Casino Royale (2006) – corrupt Montenegrin police chief (credited)
 Quantum of Solace (2008) – Man sitting in green armchair in Haitian hotel lobby (uncredited)
 Skyfall (2012) – Pallbearer at the funeral of MI6 agents (scene cut from final film)
 Spectre (2015) – Government official seen discussing positive result of Nine Eyes vote with Max Denbigh (C), alongside his son Gregg Wilson in his first cameo appearance.

Walter Gotell
A German-British actor, Walter Gotell is known for his role as General Gogol, head of the KGB, in the Bond films.

Gotell won the role of General Alexis Gogol in The Spy Who Loved Me for being a look-alike of the former head of Soviet secret police Lavrentiy Beria. His first role in the James Bond films came in 1963, when he played the henchman Morzeny in From Russia with Love. Starting in the late 1970s, he played the recurring role of General Gogol in the James Bond series, beginning with The Spy Who Loved Me in 1977. The character returned in Moonraker (1979), For Your Eyes Only (1981), Octopussy (1983), A View to a Kill (1985) and The Living Daylights (1987). As the Cold War developed, the role of leader of the KGB was seen to change attitudes to the West – from direct competitor to collaborator. His final appearance, as the Cold War began to become less imminent, sees him transferred to a different, more diplomatic role.

Morzeny
 From Russia with Love (1963)

General Anatol / Alexis Gogol
 The Spy Who Loved Me (1977)
 Moonraker (1979)
 For Your Eyes Only (1981)
 Octopussy (1983)
 A View to a Kill (1985)
 The Living Daylights (1987)

 Diane Hartford 
Hartford, née Brown, appeared in two EON films, 41 years apart. In Thunderball, she dances impromptu with Bond at the Kiss Kiss Club before Fiona Volpe cuts in. Her character presumes Volpe to be Bond's wife. Hartford was married at the time to Huntington Hartford who owned Paradise Island, a filming location for the film. In 2006's Casino Royale, she sits directly across from Bond when he plays poker against Dimitrios at the Ocean Club, founded by her ex-husband, again on Paradise Island. 

 Thunderball (1965)  – uncredited
 Casino Royale (2006) – Card Player

Eva Reuber-Staier
Austrian actress Eva Rueber-Staier is known for her role as General Gogol's assistant Rublevitch in three of the four Bond films (name spelled differently each time): The Spy Who Loved Me as Rubelvitch; For Your Eyes Only as Rublevich; and Octopussy as Rublevitch. Virginia Hey played Rubavitch (same character, different spelling) in The Living Daylights.

 The Spy Who Loved Me (1977) – Rubelvitch
 For Your Eyes Only (1981) – Rublevich
 Octopussy (1983) – Rublevitch

Jeremy Bulloch
Jeremy Bulloch played a submariner in The Spy Who Loved Me and then Q's assistant in For Your Eyes Only and Octopussy:
 The Spy Who Loved Me (1977) – Submariner aboard HMS Ranger
 For Your Eyes Only (1981) – Smithers
 Octopussy (1983) – Smithers

Jesper Christensen
Jesper Christensen plays the role of Mr. White in Casino Royale, Quantum of Solace and Spectre. He is the first actor to play the same villain in more than two films, and the first to reprise a belligerent character since Richard Kiel in Moonraker (1979).

 Casino Royale (2006)
 Quantum of Solace (2008)
 Spectre (2015)

Anthony Dawson
Throughout his career Anthony Dawson could often be found in the films of director Terence Young, including the aforementioned Dr. No, They Were Not Divided (1950),Valley of Eagles (1951), The Amorous Adventures of Moll Flanders (1965), Triple Cross (1966), Red Sun (1971), Inchon (1981), and The Jigsaw Man (1983). Young also cast him as the physical presence of Ernst Stavro Blofeld in his Bond films From Russia with Love (1963), and Thunderball (1965), stroking the ubiquitous white cat. His face was never seen though, and Blofeld's voice was provided by Eric Pohlmann.

Dawson is the only actor to play arch-villain role of Blofeld more than once.
 Dr. No (1962) – Professor Dent
 From Russia with Love (1963) – Ernst Stavro Blofeld (physical appearance)
 Thunderball (1965) – Ernst Stavro Blofeld (physical appearance)

Maud Adams
Swedish actress Maud Adams is known for her roles as two different Bond girls in two James Bond films, The Man with the Golden Gun (1974) and as the title character in Octopussy (1983). She was also an extra in A View to a Kill (1985).
 The Man with the Golden Gun (1974) – Andrea Anders
 Octopussy (1983) – Octopussy
 A View to a Kill (1985) – Bystander

George Baker
British actor George Baker, who originally appeared in an uncredited role as a NASA engineer in You Only Live Twice (1967), is known for his roles as Sir Hilary Bray in On Her Majesty's Secret Service and as Captain Benson in The Spy Who Loved Me (1977).

 You Only Live Twice (1967) – NASA Engineer (uncredited)
 On Her Majesty's Secret Service (1969) – Sir Hilary Bray
 The Spy Who Loved Me (1977) – Captain Benson

Shane Rimmer
Shane Rimmer played all different characters in the three films he appeared in. He also provided (uncredited) voice over-dubbing for the character of Hamilton in Live and Let Die (1973).

 You Only Live Twice (1967) – Hawaii Radar Operator (uncredited)
 Diamonds Are Forever (1971) – Tom (uncredited)
 The Spy Who Loved Me (1977) – Commander Carter (USS Wayne)

Vincent Wong
Vincent Wong is known for his role as General Li in Die Another Day (2002). He has two uncredited appearances also.

 Diamonds Are Forever (1971) – Casino Croupier (uncredited)
 The Spy Who Loved Me (1977) – Liparus Guard (uncredited)
 Die Another Day (2002) – General Li

Eunice Gayson
British actress born in London, England on 17 March 1931. Eunice Gayson is best known for playing Sylvia Trench, James Bond's fetching girlfriend in the first two Bond films (Dr. No and From Russia with Love). Originally, Gayson was going to be cast as Miss Moneypenny, but the part went to Lois Maxwell instead. Gayson was originally to have been a regular in the Bond film series, but her character, Sylvia Trench, was dropped.

Appearances as Sylvia Trench
 Dr. No (1962)
 From Russia with Love (1963)

Clifton James
Clifton James is known for playing the role of Sheriff J.W. Pepper in Live and Let Die and The Man with the Golden Gun.

As Sheriff John W. Pepper, Louisiana State Law Enforcement.

 Live and Let Die (1973)
 The Man with the Golden Gun (1974)

Richard Kiel
American actor Richard Kiel is best known for his role as the steel-toothed Jaws in the James Bond movies The Spy Who Loved Me (1977) and Moonraker (1979) as well as the video game Everything or Nothing, and Mr. Larson in Happy Gilmore. He stands at a towering height of 7 feet 1.5 inches (2.18 m).

As Jaws:
 The Spy Who Loved Me (1977)
 Moonraker (1979)

Robbie Coltrane
Robbie Coltrane plays the role of Valentin Dmitrovich Zukovsky in GoldenEye and The World Is Not Enough.

As Valentin Dmitrovich Zukovsky, a Russian Mafia head
 GoldenEye (1995)
 The World Is Not Enough (1999)

Giancarlo Giannini
Italian actor Giancarlo Giannini is known for his role as René Mathis in Casino Royale (2006) and Quantum of Solace (2008).
 
 Casino Royale (2006)
 Quantum of Solace (2008)

Léa Seydoux
French actress Léa Seydoux is known for her role as Madeleine Swann in Spectre (2015) and No Time to Die (2020).
 
 Spectre (2015)
 No Time to Die (2021)

Brigitte Millar
English actress Brigitte Millar is known for her role as (Doctor) Vogel in Spectre (2015) and No Time to Die (2020).

 Spectre (2015)
 No Time to Die (2021)

Charles Gray
Charles Gray appears as Ernst Stavro Blofeld in Diamonds Are Forever (1971). In the earlier You Only Live Twice (1967), he had played a British agent, Henderson, (though Australian in the novel) making him one of a small number of actors to have played a villain and a Bond ally in the series.
 You Only Live Twice (1967) – Richard "Dikko" Henderson
 Diamonds Are Forever (1971) – Ernst Stavro Blofeld (and his many "doubles")

Nadja Regin
Serbian actress Nadja Regin plays Kerim's girl in From Russia with Love (1963) and Bonita in Goldfinger (1964).
 From Russia with Love (1963) as Kerim's Girl
 Goldfinger (1964) as Bonita

Martine Beswick
Martine Beswick is best known for her two appearances in the James Bond film series. Although she auditioned for the first Bond film Dr. No, she was cast in the second film From Russia with Love as the fiery gypsy girl Zora. She engaged in the famous "catfight" scene with her rival Vida (played by former Miss Israel Aliza Gur). She was incorrectly billed as "Martin Beswick" in the title sequence. Beswick then appeared as the ill-fated Paula Caplan in Thunderball. She had been away from the Caribbean so long that she was required to sunbathe constantly for two weeks before filming, in order to look like a local.

Martine Beswick film appearances in the James Bond film series:

 From Russia with Love (1962) – Zora
 Thunderball (1965) – Paula Kaplan

Burt Kwouk
Burt Kwouk played Mr. Ling in Goldfinger (1964) and Spectre 3 in You Only Live Twice (1967).
 Goldfinger (1964) as Mr Ling
 You Only Live Twice (1967) as Spectre 3

Milton Reid
Milton Reid is known for playing Sandor in The Spy Who Loved Me (1977).

 Dr. No (1962) – Dr.No's Guard (uncredited)
 The Spy Who Loved Me (1977) – Sandor

George Roubicek
Austrian actor George Roubicek plays an American astronaut in You Only Live Twice (1967) and Stromberg One Captain in The Spy Who Loved Me (1977).

 You Only Live Twice (1967) – American Astronaut
 The Spy Who Loved Me (1977) – Stromberg One Captain

Marc Lawrence
Marc Lawrence played a Slumber Inc. attendant in Diamonds Are Forever (1971) and Rodney in The Man with the Golden Gun (1974).

 Diamonds Are Forever (1971) – Slumber Inc. Attendant 
 The Man with the Golden Gun (1974) – Rodney

Albert Moses
Sri Lankan actor Albert Moses plays a Barman in The Spy Who Loved Me (1977) and Saddrudin, an undercover British agent, in Octopussy (1983).

 The Spy Who Loved Me (1977) – Barman
 Octopussy (1983) – Saddrudin

Nadim Sawalha
Jordanian actor Nadim Sawalha (father of three daughters who are British actresses) plays Aziz Fekkesh in The Spy Who Loved Me (1977) and a Tangier police chief in The Living Daylights (1987).

 The Spy Who Loved Me (1977) – Aziz Fekkesh
 The Living Daylights (1987) – Tangier police chief

Mary Stävin
Swedish actress Mary Stävin appears in two Bond films, Octopussy (1983) and A View to a Kill (1985).

 Octopussy (1983) – Octopussy Girl
 A View to a Kill (1985) – Kimberley Jones

Tsai Chin
Chin (also known as Irene Chow) is probably best known for her role as Lin Tang, the diabolic daughter of Dr. Fu Manchu in the Christopher Lee Fu Manchu movies. She is also memorable for her role as Ling in pre-titles sequence of the James Bond movie You Only Live Twice and in the role of "Juicy Lucy" in The Virgin Soldiers. She continues to appear in films to this day, including The Joy Luck Club, Memoirs of a Geisha, and the 2006 James Bond film Casino Royale. She also has a recurring role in Grey's Anatomy as Helen Rubenstein, the mother of Cristina Yang.

She also made appearance with Christopher Lee in the Fu Manchu films who played bond villain Francisco Scaramanga in The Man with the Golden Gun.

 You Only Live Twice (1967) – Ling
 Casino Royale (2006) – Madam Wu

Richard Graydon
Richard Graydon appeared twice in uncredited roles, in On Her Majesty's Secret Service (1969) and Moonraker (1979), and twice more as a Russian Cosmonaut in You Only Live Twice (1967) and as Francisco the Fearless in Octopussy (1983).

 You Only Live Twice (1967) – Russian Cosmonaut
 On Her Majesty's Secret Service (1969) – Draco's Driver (uncredited)
 Moonraker (1979) – Space Fighter (uncredited)
 Octopussy (1983) – Francisco the Fearless

Bob Simmons
British actor Bob Simmons, although uncredited, is notable in appearing as 007 in the pre-title sequences of the first three Bond films. He also appeared, uncredited, in the roles of three villains in later films.

 Dr. No (1962) – James Bond in Gunbarrel Sequence (uncredited)
 From Russia with Love (1963) – James Bond in Gunbarrel Sequence (uncredited)
 Goldfinger (1964) – James Bond in Gunbarrel Sequence (uncredited)
 Thunderball (1965) – Colonel Jacque Bouvar – Spectre 6 (uncredited)
 The Spy Who Loved Me (1977) – Ivan, KGB Thug (uncredited)
 For Your Eyes Only (1981) – Henchman Lotus Explosion Victim (uncredited)

David de Keyser
British actor David de Keyser voice dubbed (uncredited) Marc Ange Draco in On Her Majesty's Secret Service (1969), and played a doctor in Diamonds Are Forever (1971).

 On Her Majesty's Secret Service (1969) – Marc Ange Draco (voice, uncredited)
 Diamonds Are Forever (1971) – Doctor

Voice over-dubbing only
Nikki van der Zyl
Nikki van der Zyl was heard in ten Bond films providing voice over-dubbing.
 Dr. No (1962; dubbed many female voices)
 From Russia with Love (1963; dubbed Eunice Gayson and female hotel clerk in Istanbul)
 Goldfinger (1964; dubbed Shirley Eaton and Nadja Regin, was also on-set English-language vocal coach to Gert Fröbe)
 Thunderball (1965; dubbed Claudine Auger)
 You Only Live Twice (1967; dubbed Mie Hama)
 On Her Majesty's Secret Service (1969; dubbed Virginia North)
 Diamonds Are Forever (1971; dubbed Denise Perrier)
 Live and Let Die (1973; partially dubbed Jane Seymour)
 The Man with the Golden Gun (1974; dubbed Francoise Therry)
 Moonraker (1979; dubbed Corinne Clery and Leila Shenna)

Eric Pohlmann
Eric Pohlmann voice dubbed Ernst Stavro Blofeld for Anthony Dawson in both films they were in together.
 From Russia with Love (1963) – dubbed Ernst Stavro Blofeld
 Thunderball'' (1965) – again dubbed Ernst Stavro Blofeld

Actors in recurring roles
(Two or more film appearances)

Key:

See also
 Ian Fleming – Author of the James Bond novel series
 Pinewood Studios – physical location for sets and props for the James Bond films when not filming on location
 List of actors considered for the James Bond character
 Outline of James Bond

References

List
Recurring actors
Lists of actors by film series